Umarin Yaodam ((born 22 January 1980) is a Thai former professional footballer and Thailand, who is a goalkeeping coach for Thailand.

International career
Umarin was called up to the national team, in coach Peter Reid's first squad selection for the T&T Cup, to be played in Vietnam in October 2008.

International

Honours

Club

Buriram PEA
 Thai Premier League (1): 2008

Buriram
 Thai Division 1 League (1): 2011

Muangthong United
 Thai Premier League (1): 2012

International
Thailand U-23
 Sea Games  Gold Medal (1); 2001

References

External links

1983 births
Living people
Umarin Yaodam
Umarin Yaodam
Association football goalkeepers
Umarin Yaodam
Umarin Yaodam
Umarin Yaodam
Umarin Yaodam
Umarin Yaodam
Umarin Yaodam
Umarin Yaodam
Umarin Yaodam
Umarin Yaodam
Umarin Yaodam
Umarin Yaodam
Umarin Yaodam
Southeast Asian Games medalists in football
Umarin Yaodam
Competitors at the 2001 Southeast Asian Games